The Sri Lanka Mitra Vibhushana (Decoration of Sri Lankan Friendship) is a Sri Lankan honour, for Heads of State and Heads of Government with which Sri Lanka has friendly relations “in appreciation of their friendship towards and solidarity with the people of Sri Lanka”. The recipient of the honour is awarded a citation and a silver medal, which is to be worn around the neck, studded and adorned with nine kinds of Sri Lankan gems (Nawaratna) with the symbols of a lotus, the globe, sun, moon and sheaves of rice. The ribbon on medal 6.5 Centimeters wide. The honour takes precedence over the National Honours awarded to non Sri Lankans, and will be awarded by the President as and when he/she deems fit. The names of all the recipients are contained in a register maintained under the direction of the President for the recipient of National Honours granted to Sri Lankans. The honour was introduced in February 2008 by President Mahinda Rajapaksa.

Awardees
Awardees include:

2008
 Maumoon Abdul Gayoom, 13 February 

2014
 Mahmoud Abbas, 2 January 
 Yasser Arafat, 2 January

References

External links

 
Civil awards and decorations of Sri Lanka